Ivry and Ivri may refer to:

People
 Ivrim (plural of Ivri), Hebrew for "Hebrews"
Ivri Lider (born 1974), Israeli pop star
Amit Ivry (born 1989), Israeli Olympic swimmer and national record holder

Places
 Ivry-sur-Seine, in the Val-de-Marne département
 Ivry-sur-Seine (Paris RER), a station in Paris' express suburban rail system
 Ivry-le-Temple, in the Oise département
 Ivry-en-Montagne, in the Côte-d'Or département in eastern France
 Ivry-la-Bataille, in the Eure département in the Haute-Normandie region in northern France
 Ivry-sur-le-Lac, in the Laurentians, north of Montreal, Canada

Other
Indian Veterinary Research Institute (IVRI), Indian research facility in the field of the field of veterinary medicine.
Mishpat Ivri, "Hebrew law" or "Jewish/Hebrew jurisprudence."
Ivry (poem), by Thomas Babington Macaulay